Partulina tessellata is a species of tropical air-breathing land snail, a terrestrial pulmonate gastropod mollusk in the family Achatinellidae. This species is endemic to Hawaii in the United States.

References

Molluscs of Hawaii
Partulina
Gastropods described in 1853
Taxonomy articles created by Polbot